Expedition of Ali ibn Abi Talib may refer to a number of expeditions by Ali ibn Abi Talib including:

Expedition of Ali ibn Abi Talib (Fadak), December, 627 AD, 8th month of 6AH
Expedition of Ali ibn Abi Talib (Al-Fuls), August 630 AD, 2nd month of 9AH, to destroy the statue (idol) of the pagan deity al-Fuls (al-Qullus) of Banu Tai tribe, and convert them to Islam 
Expedition of Ali ibn Abi Talib (Hamdan), 631 AD, 10AH to convert the people of Yemen to Islam
Expedition of Ali ibn Abi Talib (Mudhij), around December 631 AD, Ramadan 10AH